Khrystyna Danylivna Alchevska (née , Zhuravlyova) (1841–1920) was a Russian Imperial and Ukrainian teacher and a prominent activist for national education in Imperial Russia. She created a methodical training system which was implemented in many schools of Russian Empire. In 1862, she organized the first free girls' school in Ukraine. In 1889, she was elected vice-president of the International League of Education in Paris.

Biography

Khrystyna was born 16 April 1841 in Borzna, Chernigov Governorate, Russian Empire (now in Ukraine). She was born in the family of a district teacher of Russian literature Danila Zhuravlyov (1809–?) from a marriage with a noblewoman Annette Nikolaevna Vuich (1809–1857), who decided on a misalliance for love. Her mother Annette was a daughter of Russian general Nikolay Vuich, she studied at the Smolny Institute of Noble Maidens in St. Petersburg. 

Khrystyna married Aleksey Alchevsky, a Russian Imperial businessman, later owner of a large mine and steel plant, co-founder of Kharkiv Hromada. Their children numbered many talented and accomplished artists. Son, Ivan Alchevsky, was a renowned opera singer. Daughter, Khrystia Alchevska, was a poet. Son, Gregory Alchevsky, was a composer. 
 
She lived and worked in Kharkiv where died on 15 August 1920.

Professional life
Beginning in 1862, she maintained the Kharkiv Women's Sunday School (officially accredited in 1870) at her own expense. Her school was liquidated by the Soviet regime in 1919. The school remained in existence for 50 years and was renowned for its highly developed methods of adult education. Borys Hrinchenko taught at the school as a young man. She was an eminent pedagogue who initiated a method of adult education using literary works, rather than spelling books. 

In 1889, she attended the Paris Exhibition as the representative of Russian Empire teachers of adult students. She taught classes in Ukrainian until forced by the government to switch to Russian.

Alchevska compiled an award-winning methodological and bibliographical guide, What the People Should Read, (Chto chitat’ narodu) in 1906. This work earned the grand prize at the Paris International Exhibition, and a teaching manual, Book for Adults (Kniga vzroslykh) in 1900. She also wrote a memoir, My Thoughts and Experiences ("Peredumannoe i perezhitoe), in 1912. She also published several methodological articles on adult education. In the 1860s, Alchevska's articles appeared in Aleksandr Herzen's journal Kolokol, under the pseudonym Ukrainka.
Alchevska encouraged girls and women to dress in traditional regional costumes at community festivals and to perform folksongs. She wore peasant costume as a symbol of her dedication to the people she taught. Her adaptation of folk culture and folk art helped peasants adjust to city life.

Works

 Алчевская Х. Д. О первой книге для классного чтения взрослых М., 1895.
 Алчевская Х. Д. Передуманное и пережитое: дневники, письма, воспоминания. М., 1912.
 Алчевская Х. Д.'' Что читать народу? Критич. указатель книг для нар. и дет. чтения. В трёх томах. СПб., 1884–1906.

Legacy
In 1963, O. Mazurkevych published a book on the educational work of Alchevska and her colleagues.

References

1841 births
1920 deaths
People from Borzna
Ukrainian people of Serbian descent
Educators from the Russian Empire
Women educators
Women educational theorists
Women writers from the Russian Empire
Writers from the Russian Empire
19th-century women writers
20th-century women writers